Plectritis is a genus of plants in the honeysuckle family (Caprifoliaceae). There are only three to five species. They are known generally as seablushes, and they are native to western North America and Chile. These are unassuming annual plants with thin, erect stems with few leaves and bearing a terminal inflorescence of flowers. The flower head bears several tiny flowers in shades of pink or white.

Species:

Plectritis ciliosa - longspur seablush
Plectritis congesta - shortspur seablush
Plectritis macrocera - longhorn plectritis, white plectritis

References

External links
Jepson Manual Treatment

Valerianoideae
Caprifoliaceae genera